George Handel Sadler (7 May 1915 – 30 December 2004) was an English footballer who played as a full-back.

Career
Sadler began his career at Gainsborough Trinity. In December 1938, Sadler signed for West Ham United. Due to the outbreak of World War II, Sadler did not make his debut until 7 December 1946, playing in a 4–2 defeat away to Southampton. This game was Sadler's only appearance for West Ham, as well as his only Football League appearance. In 1947, Sadler signed for Guildford City. On 26 April 1954, West Ham sent a team to Guildford City for a benefit match for Sadler. Guildford won 4–2.

References

1915 births
2004 deaths
People from Whitwell, Derbyshire
Footballers from Derbyshire
Association football defenders
English footballers
Gainsborough Trinity F.C. players
West Ham United F.C. players
Guildford City F.C. players
English Football League players